Athanasios "Sakis" Boulas (11 March 1954 – 21 February 2014) was a Greek singer, songwriter and actor. He made several studio albums and wrote songs for other musicians. He also starred in several television shows and films.

Biography
He was born in 1954 in Kilkis, Greece and raised in Piraeus. In 1976 he started out his career as the narrator of the documentary film Arkadi 1866. In 1983 he appeared in the film Dracula of Exarchia, and later that same year takes part in the film Bitter Movie.

Boulas died of cancer after several months treatment in an Athens clinic, on 21 February 2014, aged 60.

References

External links
 

1954 births
2014 deaths
20th-century Greek male actors
21st-century Greek male actors
20th-century Greek male singers
21st-century Greek male singers
Greek male film actors
Greek male television actors
Greek singer-songwriters
People from Kilkis
Deaths from cancer in Greece